Dicentra peregrina (Japanese コマクサ komakusa) is a herbaceous perennial growing from a rhizome, native to mountains in Japan and nearby areas of East Asia.

Etymology
The species name peregrina is Latin for "exotic, alien, foreign, strange, from foreign lands", possibly because the species is the only one of its genus outside of North America.

In Japanese, the plant (kusa) is named for the buds, which look like the head of a horse (koma).

Description
Leaves are gray-green, glaucous, and deeply cut, with linear lobes.

Flowers have four rose-purple, pink, cream, pale yellow, or white petals and two tiny sepals. Outer petals are pouched at the base and strongly bent back at the ends. Inner petals are long and protruding, connected at the end.

Ecology
Komakusa grows in Japan, the Kuril Islands, Sakhalin Island, and northeastern Siberia, including the Kamchatka Peninsula. It favors gravelly soil at high altitudes, in alpine tundra.

Cultivars

There are several hybrid cultivars, cultivated as ornamental plants, involving Dicentra eximia, Dicentra formosa, and Dicentra nevadensis.
Dicentra 'Candy Hearts' (D. eximia × D. peregrina)rose-pink flowers
Dicentra 'Gothenburg' (D. formosa subsp. oregana × D. peregrina f. alba) – light pink flowers
Dicentra 'Ivory Hearts' (D. eximia × D. peregrina)white flowers
Dicentra 'King of Hearts' – D. peregrina × (D. formosa subsp. oregana × D. eximia)pink flowers
Dicentra 'Luxuriant' (D. eximia × D. peregrina)cherry-red flowers
Dicentra 'Tsuneshigo Rokujo' (D. nevadensis × D. peregrina)pink flowers

References

 Bleeding hearts, Corydalis, and their relatives. Mark Tebbitt, Magnus Lidén, and Henrik Zetterlund. Timber Press. 2008. — Google Books

External links

Pacific Bulb Society: Dicentra peregrina
Flavon's wild herb and alpine plants: gallery

peregrina
Flora of Northeast Asia
Flora of Japan
Flora of Siberia
Garden plants of Asia